Euryoryzomys macconnelli, also known as MacConnell's rice rat or MacConnell's oryzomys, is a rodent species from South America. It is found in Brazil, Colombia, Ecuador, French Guiana, Guyana, Peru, Suriname and Venezuela, where it lives in lowland tropical rainforest. It was formerly placed in the genus Oryzomys, as Oryzomys macconnelli, but in 2006 it was reclassified as the type species of the new genus Euryoryzomys.

References

Euryoryzomys
Rodents of South America
Mammals of Brazil
Mammals of Colombia
Mammals of Ecuador
Mammals of French Guiana
Mammals of Guyana
Mammals of Peru
Mammals of Suriname
Mammals of Venezuela
Mammals described in 1910
Taxa named by Oldfield Thomas